The qualification matches for Group 6 of the European zone (UEFA) of the 1994 FIFA World Cup qualification tournament took place between May 1992 and November 1993. The teams competed on a home-and-away basis with the winner and runner-up claiming 2 of the 12 spots in the final tournament allocated to the European zone. The group consisted of Austria, Bulgaria, Finland, France, Israel, and Sweden.

Standings

Results

Goalscorers

7 goals

 Martin Dahlin

6 goals

 Éric Cantona

5 goals

 Andreas Herzog
 Hristo Stoichkov

4 goals

 Emil Kostadinov
 Jean-Pierre Papin

3 goals

 Lyuboslav Penev
 Laurent Blanc
 Ronen Harazi
 Tomas Brolin

2 goals

 Dietmar Kühbauer
 Heimo Pfeifenberger
 Anton Polster
 Krasimir Balakov
 Nasko Sirakov
 Ari Hjelm
 Aki Hyryläinen
 Franck Sauzée
 Ronny Rosenthal
 Itzik Zohar
 Klas Ingesson

1 goal

 Andreas Ogris
 Hannes Reinmayr
 Peter Stöger
 Michael Zisser
 Trifon Ivanov
 Yordan Lechkov
 Zlatko Yankov
 Petri Järvinen
 Jari Litmanen
 Mika-Matti Paatelainen
 Marko Rajamäki
 Kim Suominen
 David Ginola
 Alain Roche
 Reuven Atar
 Tal Banin
 Eyal Berkovic
 Jan Eriksson
 Stefan Landberg
 Henrik Larsson
 Anders Limpar
 Håkan Mild
 Stefan Pettersson
 Pär Zetterberg

Notes

External links
Group 6 Detailed Results at RSSSF

6
FIFA World Cup
FIFA World Cup
FIFA
FIFA
Qual
1992–93 in Bulgarian football
Qual
1992–93 in French football
qual
1992–93 in Austrian football
1993–94 in Austrian football
1992 in Finnish football
1993 in Finnish football
1991–92 in Bulgarian football